The withdrawal of previously declassified U.S. federal records is a process in which agencies can remove records from public access that they believe were incorrectly declassified and made available to the public at the National Archives and Records Administration. The process is often referred to as "reclassification," but because the records were never properly declassified and remained classified even when made publicly available, they are not re-classified.

History
In 1995, President Clinton signed Executive Order 12958 which directed agencies to declassify all records that were twenty-five years or older by the end of 1999, with certain exemptions for information that remained sensitive. Security concerns over restricted data were heightened in 1999 by the Wen Ho Lee case, in which a Taiwanese American nuclear weapons engineer was accused of selling secrets to the People’s Republic of China. Additionally, the State Department was accused by the Department of Energy of improperly releasing information it was not authorized to declassify. In 1999, declassification efforts slowed considerably with the passage of the Kyl-Lott Amendment to the 1999 Defense Authorization Act which requires that all declassified records be reviewed for restricted data (RD) and formerly restricted data (FRD). The Kyl-Lott Amendment led to the removal of previously declassified records from public access for re-review of restricted data.

During the George W. Bush administration, the signing of Executive Order 13292 in 2003 eased the process of withdrawals and further delayed automatic declassification review. The process was further codified in 2009 by the signing of Executive Order 13526 and 32 C.F.R. Part 2001.13.

The process of removing previously declassified records was itself covert until it was revealed by the National Security Archive in February 2006. Following outcry by journalists, historians, and the public, an internal audit by the National Archive’s Information Security Oversight Office indicated that more than one-third of the records withdrawn since 1999, did not contain sensitive information. In response, the National Archives has made annual reports of records withdrawn from public access.

Withdrawals of Previously Declassified Records since 2006

See also
Executive Order 13233
Freedom of Information Act (United States)
National Declassification Center

Notes

Reference

External links
Declassification in Reverse
Secret Agreement Reveals Covert Program to Hide Reclassification from Public
The Great Bush Reclassification Project
How Many and Where Were the Nukes?
ISOO Audit Report Exposes Abuse of Classification System

United States government secrecy
Classified information in the United States
Freedom of Information Act (United States)
National Archives and Records Administration